Whitebait is a collective term for the immature fry of fish, typically between  long. Such young fish often travel together in schools along coasts, and move into estuaries and sometimes up rivers where they can be easily caught using fine-meshed fishing nets. Whitebaiting is the activity of catching whitebait.

Individual whitebait are tender and edible, and are considered a delicacy in New Zealand. The entire fish is eaten - including head, fins, bones, and bowels. Some species make better eating than others, and the particular species that are marketed as "whitebait" vary in different parts of the world.

As whitebait consists of immature fry of many important food species (such as herring, sprat, sardines, mackerel, bass and many others) it is not an ecologically viable foodstuff and several countries impose strict controls on harvesting.

Whitebait by region

Alboran Sea 
The Alboran Sea is the westernmost element of the Mediterranean Sea. Whitebait have been consumed as a favoured element of the diet of peoples living along the northern coasts of the Alboran Sea in Spain, even though sale of these products has been banned.

Australia 
In Australia whitebait refers to the juvenile stage of several predominantly galaxias species during their return to freshwater from the marine phase of their lifecycle.

Species referred to as whitebait in Australia include Common galaxias G. maculatus, Climbing galaxias G. brevipinnis, Spotted galaxias G. truttaceus, Tasmanian whitebait Lovettia sealii, Tasmanian mudfish Neochanna cleaveri, and Tasmanian smelt Retropinna tasmanica.

Whitebait were once subject to a substantial commercial fishery but today only recreational fishers are permitted to gather them, under strict conditions and for a limited season.

China 
Chinese whitebait is raised in fish farms and plentiful quantities are produced for export. The Chinese whitebait is larger than the New Zealand whitebait and not nearly so delicate. The frozen product is commonly available in food stores and supermarkets at reasonable prices. The Chinese name for these is often translated as "silver fish" in English.

Italy 
Gianchetti (also bianchetti) are the whitebait of the pesce azzurro of the Mediterranean (sardines and anchovies, etc.), caught with special nets named from the Ligurian sciabegottu (similar to the net to sciabica, but with smaller dimensions) in the early months of the year.

A speciality of the Liguria cuisine, gianchetti are generally lightly boiled in salted water and served hot, dressed with oil and lemon juice. Another classic approach is to make fritters of the fish together with an egg and flour batter; finally they may simply be dipped in flour and deep fried (Frittelle di Gianchetti/Bianchetti). The gianchetti of a red colour (ruscetti, rossetti) are tougher and scaly to the palate: they are largely used to flavour fish-based sauces.

In Sicilian cuisine whitebait are known as ceruses (literally translated as "baby"). Whitebait are the principal ingredient of the Sicilian specialty croquette polpette di neonata; which are a type of rolled meatball of whitebait with parsley, and egg and/or a bit of flour to amalgamate, fried in olive oil or sometimes deep-fried in peanut oil.

In Neapolitan cuisine whitebait are known as cicenielli.

In Brindisian cuisine whitebait are known as chuma (literally foam of sea).

Japan 

In Japan, the  fishing industry is concentrated in Shizuoka Prefecture, where the major landing ports for them are situated. The shirasu boiled in salted hot water is called , and this product retains about 85% or greater water ratio.

New Zealand 

New Zealand whitebait are the juveniles of five galaxiid species which live as adults in freshwater rivers and streams. Four of these five species have been classified by the Department of Conservation as endangered. The whitebait are caught during their migration into freshwater habitats after their larval stage at sea. They are much smaller than Chinese or British whitebait, averaging 45–55 mm in length and are around 15–22 weeks old.

The most common whitebait species in New Zealand is the common galaxias or īnanga, which lays its eggs during the very high spring tides in autumn amongst bankside grasses that are flooded by the tide. The eggs develop out of the water until inundated by the next spring tide which stimulates the eggs to hatch. The larvae are then carried to sea on the outgoing tide where they join the ocean's plankton. After approximately six months, the juvenile fish migrate back into freshwater habitats where they mature to adulthood. The four other galaxiid species in New Zealand whitebait are the kōaro, banded kōkopu, giant kōkopu and shortjaw kōkopu. These species also spawn in bankside vegetation, but their spawning is triggered by autumn floods rather than tides.

New Zealand whitebait are caught in the lower reaches of the rivers using large, open-mouthed, hand-held scoop nets, long sock nets, or rigid, typically wedge-shaped set nets. Whitebaiters must constantly attend the nets in order to lift them as soon as a shoal enters the net, otherwise the whitebait quickly swim back out of the net. Whitebaiters may fish from platforms known as a 'stand', which may include screens to direct the fish and systems for raising and lowering nets.

Whitebaiting in New Zealand is a seasonal activity with a legally fixed and limited period which spans part of the annual migration. The timing of the allowed fishing season is set to target the more common inanga, while avoiding the less common species that mainly migrate before and after the whitebaiting season. There is strict control over net sizes and rules against blocking the river or channelling the fish into the net to allow some fish to reach the adult habitats. The whitebait themselves are very sensitive to objects in the river and are adept at dodging the nets.

Whitebait is a delicacy and commands high prices to the extent that it is the most expensive fish on the market, when available. It is normally sold fresh in small quantities, although some are frozen to extend the sale period. Nevertheless, whitebait can normally only be purchased during or close after the netting season. The most popular way of cooking whitebait in New Zealand is the whitebait fritter, which is essentially an omelette containing whitebait. Purists use only the egg white in order to minimise interfering with the taste of the bait.

The degradation of waterways through forest clearance, and the impacts of agriculture and urbanisation, have caused the whitebait catch to decline. The loss of suitable spawning habitat has been particularly severe, especially for inanga, which rely on dense riparian vegetation lining the tidal portions of waterways. Amongst other factors, a lack of shade over waterways has been shown to kill developing whitebait eggs.

United Kingdom 

In the United Kingdom today, whitebait principally refers to the fry of Clupeidae fish, young sprats, most commonly herring. They are normally deep-fried, coated in flour or a light batter, and served very hot with sprinkled lemon juice and bread and butter. Whitebait are very hard to buy fresh unless the buyer goes to a fishing harbour early in the morning, as most are frozen on the boat.

Records of whitebait as a food in England date back to 1612. By the 1780s it was fashionable to dine on whitebait. In those days, whitebait was thought to be a species or group on its own right, and the French zoologist Valenciennes proposed that whitebait was a new genus, which he called Rogenia. In 1903, Dr James Murie, in his 'Report on the sea fisheries and fishing industry of the Thames estuary' conducted studies on the contents of boxes sold as whitebait. He discovered that some boxes of whitebait contained up to 23 species of immature fish, including the fry of eel, plaice, whiting, herring sprat and bass, along with shrimp, crab, octopus and even jellyfish.

For Londoners in the 19th century and before, summer excursions down the Thames to Greenwich or Blackwall to dine on whitebait were popular. For instance, the Cabinet undertook such a trip every year shortly before the prorogation of Parliament. An annual whitebait festival takes place in Southend.

Given that UK and imported whitebait still consists of immature herring, sprat, sardines, mackerel, bass and many others, it is not an ecologically viable foodstuff. Removing these fish at such a juvenile stage, before they have had a chance to grow and reproduce, might severely reduce future fish stocks. The Marine Conservation Society (MCS) is a non-government organisation that provides independent information on the sustainability of fish stocks and species around the world, and has a rating system for fish sustainability, in order to safeguard future stocks. The MCS suggests avoiding eating and purchasing the juvenile whitebait as it is detrimental to sustainable fish populations.

Puerto Rico 
Residents of Arecibo, Puerto Rico traditionally fish for whitebait at the mouth of the Río Grande de Arecibo. The fish are known locally as cetí and classified as Pellona bleekeriana or Sicydium plumieri.

Elvers 
Elvers are young eels. Traditionally, fishermen consumed elvers as a cheap dish, but environmental changes have reduced eel populations. Similar to whitebait, they are now considered a delicacy and are priced at up to 1000 euro per kilogram.

Cuttlefish, octopus and squid 

Battered and fried baby cephalopods (usually cuttlefish, but sometimes squid or octopus), known as puntillitas or chopitos, are popular in southern Spain and the Balearic Islands and possibly elsewhere.

Explanatory notes

References 
Footnotes

Bibliography

 ; text@Google (abstract in English).

External links 
 Whitebait and whitebaiting in Te Ara – the Encyclopedia of New Zealand
 
 

Galaxiidae
Seafood
Edible fish
Commercial fish
New Zealand cuisine
British seafood dishes